Israel Emanuel Coll (born 22 July 1993) is an Argentine professional footballer who plays as a midfielder for Apollon Limassol.

Career
Coll's first senior club became Ferro Carril Oeste in 2011–12, when he was an unused substitute on four occasions for the Primera B Nacional outfit. He made his professional debut in March 2013, featuring for the full duration of a 0–0 draw with Douglas Haig on 18 March. Two months later, Coll scored his first goal in a draw with Huracán. One hundred and five further appearances followed for Coll between 2013 and 2015; he also netted seven more goals in that period. He was loaned to Sarmiento of the Argentine Primera División on 7 January 2016. He featured four times as Sarmiento placed tenth in zone one.

In the subsequent campaign, 2016–17, Coll was signed on loan by Primera B Nacional's Central Córdoba. His debut season ended with relegation to Torneo Federal A, despite that Coll agreed to sign permanently in August 2017. After Central Córdoba achieved instant promotion back up as champions, Coll departed the club and Argentine football as he joined Greek Football League side Panachaiki on 25 July 2018. He scored on his league debut, netting in a 2–2 draw with Aiginiakos on 28 October.

Career statistics
.

Honours
Central Córdoba
Torneo Federal A: 2017–18

References

External links

1993 births
Living people
Footballers from Córdoba, Argentina
Argentine footballers
Association football midfielders
Argentine expatriate footballers
Expatriate footballers in Greece
Argentine expatriate sportspeople in Greece
Primera Nacional players
Argentine Primera División players
Torneo Federal A players
Super League Greece players
Football League (Greece) players
Super League Greece 2 players
Ferro Carril Oeste footballers
Club Atlético Sarmiento footballers
Central Córdoba de Santiago del Estero footballers
Panachaiki F.C. players
Apollon Smyrnis F.C. players
Apollon Limassol FC players
Argentine expatriate sportspeople in Cyprus
Expatriate footballers in Cyprus